Many history and cultural museums have large numismatic collections (coins, money, and tokens). Some museums are specifically dedicated to the history of money or coins, while others have major collections amongst other material. Many small museums often have important collections of coins from their local area or important archaeological sites.

References 

numismatic